The San Pablo Fault is a fault in northern California. It is an offshoot of the Hayward Fault. It formed the Potrero Hills in Richmond, California.

Notes

Seismic faults of California
Geology of Alameda County, California
Geology of Contra Costa County, California
Geography of Richmond, California